Peaceful Heart, Gentle Spirit is an album by American jazz saxophonist Chico Freeman recorded in 1980 and released on the Contemporary label.

Reception
The Allmusic review by Scott Yanow awarded the album 4½ stars stating "This music is stimulating and represents one of the highpoints of Freeman's rather streaky career". The Rolling Stone Jazz Record Guide said the album was "perhaps the best opportunity to sample Freeman's writing and instrumental arsenal"

Track listing
All compositions by Chico Freeman
 "Peaceful Heart, Gentle Spirit" - 7:21   
 "Freedom Swing Song (Dedicated to Eric Dolphy)" - 7:20   
 "Look Up" - 7:05   
 "Nia's Song Dance" - 8:50   
 "Morning Prayer" - 9:46

Personnel
Chico Freeman - tenor saxophone, soprano saxophone, clarinet, bass clarinet, alto flute
James Newton - flute, bass flute
Jay Hoggard - vibraphone
Kenny Kirkland - piano
John Koenig - cello
Buster Williams - bass
Billy Hart - drums
Paulinho Da Costa, Efrain Toro - percussion

References 

Contemporary Records albums
Chico Freeman albums
1980 albums